AE Kouklion was a football team based in Kouklia of Paphos District. It was founded on 20 October 1968 and was dissolved on 9 June 2014, in order to be merged with AEP Paphos and create a new team, Pafos FC.

History
Soon after its foundation the club joined in POAS Paphos and participated in their respective amateur leagues. It has participated in the Second Division, Third Division and Fourth Division. For the first time in the team's history in the 2012–13 season, with Belgian Fangio Buyse as player/manager, the team was promoted to the Cypriot First Division. On 9 June 2014, AEK Kouklia was merged with AEP Paphos and created a new team, Pafos FC.

League history
The following table shows the progress of the team in time (for those seasons found data).

Honours
 Cypriot Third Division: 1
2011–12
 Cypriot Second Division:
Runner-up: 2012–13
 Cypriot Cup for lower divisions:
Runner-up: (2) 2009–10, 2011–12

Managers
Demetris Ioannou (22 June 2013 – 8 April 2014)
Stavros Fitidis (8 April 2014–)

References

External links
 
 Profile at CFA

Defunct football clubs in Cyprus
Association football clubs established in 1968
1968 establishments in Cyprus